Cristaldi is a family name of Italian origin. It may refer to:

 Emanuelle Cristaldi, Italian actress and pornographic actress
 Franco Cristaldi, Italian film producer
 Pasquale Liotta Cristaldi, Italian painter
 Massimo Cristaldi, Italian film producer

Italian-language surnames